Robert Schloredt (October 2, 1939 – May 16, 2019) was an American football quarterback in the NCAA Division I and CFL and coaching in both the NCAA and World Football League.

Early years
Schloredt was born in Deadwood, South Dakota in 1939 and attended Gresham High School in suburban Portland. He was blinded in his left eye from a fireworks injury suffered at the age of five.

College
Schloredt played quarterback and defensive back for the Washington Huskies from 1958 to 1960. In 1959, Schloredt earned Associated Press first-team All-America honors as a quarterback while also leading the Huskies with six interceptions that season.  In 1960, he became the first University of Washington football player to appear on the cover of Sports Illustrated.

Schloredt ran the option and was 15-2 as a starter, leading the team to victories in both the 1960 Rose Bowl and 1961 Rose Bowl games.

Professional career
Schloredt was drafted in the 1961 CFL Draft by the British Columbia Lions and in the 1961 American Football League draft by the Dallas Texans. Schloredt played for the Lions for two seasons.

Coaching career
Following his CFL career, Schloredt was assistant coach for the Washington Huskies for eleven years. He joined The Hawaiians of the WFL which later folded mid-season.

Awards
Schloredt was awarded the 1959 W. J. Voit Memorial Trophy as the outstanding football player on the Pacific Coast. He named the Most Valuable Player of the 1960 and 1961 Rose Bowl games. He was the first two-time recipient, later joined by Charles White, Ron Dayne, and Vince Young.

He was inducted into the College Football Hall of Fame in 1989 and the Rose Bowl Hall of Fame in 1991.

Death
Schloredt's family announced his death on May 16, 2019.

See also
 Washington Huskies football statistical leaders

References

External links
 
 Washington profile
 Just Sports Stats

1939 births
2019 deaths
American football quarterbacks
American players of Canadian football
Canadian football quarterbacks
BC Lions players
The Hawaiians coaches
Washington Huskies football coaches
Washington Huskies football players
College Football Hall of Fame inductees
Gresham High School (Oregon) alumni
Sportspeople from Gresham, Oregon
People from Deadwood, South Dakota
Players of American football from Oregon
Players of American football from South Dakota